This article provides information on candidates who stood for the 1910 Australian federal election. The election was held on 13 April 1910.

The Commonwealth Liberal Party was formed in 1909 as a merger between several conservative groups. Seats previously held by the Protectionist Party, the Anti-Socialist Party, the Western Australian Party, or the Victorian independent Protectionists are considered to be held by the Liberal Party.

By-elections, appointments and defections

By-elections and appointments
On 10 July 1907, Albert Palmer (Anti-Socialist) was re-elected to Echuca after his election in 1906 was declared void.
On 11 July 1907, James O'Loghlin (Labour) was appointed as a South Australian Senator after the voiding of the election of Joseph Vardon (Anti-Socialist).
On 15 February 1908, Joseph Vardon (Anti-Socialist) was elected as a South Australian Senator in a special election following the voiding of the appointment of James O'Loghlin (Labour).
On 13 June 1908, Ernest Roberts (Labour) was elected to replace Charles Kingston (Protectionist) as the member for Adelaide.
On 28 August 1909, Richard Foster (Liberal) was elected to replace Sir Frederick Holder (Independent) as the member for Wakefield.
On 6 December 1909, James Hutchison (Labour), the member for Hindmarsh, died. Due to the proximity of the election, no by-election was held.
On 24 December 1909, George Reid (Liberal) resigned as the member for East Sydney. Due to the proximity of the election, no by-election was held.

Defections
In 1909, Protectionist leader Alfred Deakin negotiated a merger between his party and Joseph Cook's Anti-Socialists, which became the Commonwealth Liberal Party. The party was joined by most sitting Protectionists and Anti-Socialists, together with Labour MP James Fowler (Perth), WAP MP William Hedges (Fremantle), Independent Senator William Trenwith (Victoria), and the "Corner" group of Independent Protectionists: George Fairbairn (Fawkner), Sir John Forrest (Swan), Sir John Quick (Bendigo), Sydney Sampson (Wimmera) and Agar Wynne (Balaclava). Protectionists Sir William Lyne (Hume), George Wise (Gippsland) and David Storrer (Bass), who were sceptical of the merger, became Independents, as did Anti-Socialist Senator Sir Josiah Symon (South Australia). Protectionist MP John Chanter (Riverina) joined the Labour Party.

Retiring Members and Senators

Labour
 Chris Watson MP (South Sydney, NSW)
Senator John Croft (WA)

Liberal
 Sir Thomas Ewing MP (Richmond, NSW)
 Sir Philip Fysh MP (Denison, Tas)
 Dugald Thomson MP (North Sydney, NSW)

House of Representatives
Sitting members at the time of the election are shown in bold text.
Successful candidates are highlighted in the relevant colour. Where there is possible confusion, an asterisk (*) is also used.

New South Wales

Queensland

South Australia

Tasmania

Victoria

Western Australia

Senate
Sitting senators are shown in bold text. Tickets that elected at least one Senator are highlighted in the relevant colour. Successful candidates are identified by an asterisk (*).

New South Wales
Three seats were up for election. The Liberal Party was defending three seats. Liberal Senators Sir Albert Gould, Edward Millen and James Walker were not up for re-election.

Queensland
Three seats were up for election. The Labour Party was defending three seats. Liberal Senators Thomas Chataway, Robert Sayers and Anthony St Ledger were not up for re-election.

South Australia
Three seats were up for election. The Labour Party was defending three seats. Liberal Senator Joseph Vardon, Labour Senator William Russell and Independent Senator Sir Josiah Symon were not up for re-election.

Tasmania
Three seats were up for election. The Liberal Party was defending three seats. Liberal Senators Cyril Cameron, John Clemons and John Keating were not up for re-election.

Victoria
Three seats were up for election. The Liberal Party was defending two seats. The Labour Party was defending one seat. Liberal Senators Simon Fraser and James McColl and Labour Senator Edward Russell were not up for re-election.

Western Australia
Three seats were up for election. The Labour Party was defending three seats. Labour Senators Patrick Lynch, Ted Needham and George Pearce were not up for re-election.

See also
 1910 Australian federal election
 Members of the Australian House of Representatives, 1906–1910
 Members of the Australian House of Representatives, 1910–1913
 Members of the Australian Senate, 1907–1910
 Members of the Australian Senate, 1910–1913
 List of political parties in Australia

References
Adam Carr's Election Archive - House of Representatives 1910
Adam Carr's Election Archive - Senate 1910

1910 in Australia
Candidates for Australian federal elections